The Stadio Silvio Piola is a multi-use stadium in Novara, Italy. It is currently used mostly for football matches and is the home ground of Novara Calcio. The stadium holds 17,875 and was named after Italy legend and former player Silvio Piola (1913–1996).

References

Silvio
Silvio Piola
Buildings and structures in Novara
Sports venues in Piedmont
1976 establishments in Italy
Sports venues completed in 1976

Juventus F.C. (women)
Sport in Novara